The Henry Hudson Trail is a rail trail in western and northern Monmouth County, New Jersey. The trail is named for Henry Hudson, who explored the harbor at Atlantic Highlands and the Raritan Bayshore coastline in the early 1600s. The trail is not near the Hudson River.

The ,  paved multi-use
trail is part of the Monmouth County Park System. The rail trail
traverses the Raritan Bayshore region from Highlands and connects inland
to Freehold Borough using the former
rights-of-way of several rail lines. Although trees line much of the trail, it affords some views of surrounding wetlands, streams, woodlands and fields. It traverses through the municipalities of Freehold, Marlboro, Matawan, Aberdeen, Keyport, Union Beach, Hazlet, Keansburg, Middletown, and Atlantic Highlands.

The Garden State Parkway is the dividing line between the northern and southern sections of the trail. The northern section runs 12 miles east from the Aberdeen-Keyport border to Highlands, north of and roughly parallel to NJ Route 36. A missing link in Atlantic Highlands requires on-road travel between Avenue D and the Atlantic Highlands marina. The southern (inland) section runs south from Matawan to Freehold Borough. A long missing link in Marlboro divides this inland section into its own north and south segments.

The property for the inland sections is currently railbanked by New Jersey Transit (NJT), which leases the line for trail usage to the Monmouth County Park System. The trail is administered by the Monmouth County Park System and is leased through 2020 for use as a trail. If future economic conditions warrant resuming operation, NJT reserves the right to restore rail service at any time. The railroad line was never officially abandoned, unlike most rail trails.

The Henry Hudson Trail was the first rail-trail developed in Monmouth County,
and was joined by the Union Transportation rail-trail in 2010.

Trail sections

Inland South
The southern segment of the inland section runs from County Route 537 in Freehold north to Allen Road in Marlboro (near Marlboro High School and Route 79). This section was opened in 2006.  In 2013 a connecting trail was built from a point near the Allen Road terminus to the trails of the county's Big Brook Park.

Inland North
The northern segment of the inland section runs from Wyncrest Road in Marlboro north to Stillwell Street in Matawan, generally paralleling Route 79 for much of the way. This section was opened in 2006, with a short additional stretch completed in 2011. This segment has an old train station which has fallen into disrepair due to no longer being used. However it has now been restored as of 2021.

Atlantic
The Atlantic section running east-west was the first to be developed, opening in 1992. The route roughly parallels Route 36 from the Garden State Parkway to Atlantic Highlands, with trail heads at Lloyd Road and Clark Street in Aberdeen/Keyport and Avenue D in Atlantic Highlands. This section suffers from many busy road crossings.

Bayshore
The  Bayshore extension (formerly Bayshore Trail) opened in April 2009 and extends the Henry Hudson Trail eastward from the Atlantic Highlands marina below the bluffs of Atlantic Highlands, ending at Popamora Point Park at the western end of Highlands.

History
The Marlboro Township section of the rail line began in the 1860s as the Monmouth County
Agricultural Railroad. The initial discussion concerning the construction of the railroad began in the 1840s, as an improved means of hauling produce to Keyport docks. The initial effort failed and began again in 1867 with work being completed about 1880. The railroad carried produce, manufactured goods and marl
fertilizer to the rail pier in Keyport. The marl was dug from the large pits owned by many local farmers such as O.C. Herbert or Uriah Smock in Marlboro. The railroad can be seen on a map from 1873. All
service ceased in the 1950s. The
original  "Atlantic" section is built on the former right-of-way
of the Freehold and Atlantic Highlands Railroad, which was later absorbed by
the Central Railroad of New Jersey.

In September 2009, a portion of the southern section of the trail from Texas Road (Matawan) to Greenwood Road (Marlboro) was closed for an 18-month project for a Superfund cleanup at the site of the former Imperial oil company.

Future considerations
The final two "missing links" are on hold as NJT has resurrected the idea of utilizing the
rail corridor for its MOM commuter rail line.
According to the Sierra Club, should the transit agency opt to restore commuter service along
the line, it would be the first instance in U.S history where a rail trail reverted to
railway usage.

In 2020, land was acquired, and  engineering studies are in progress, to extend the southern end of the trail into downtown Freehold.

See also
Assunpink Trail
Delaware and Raritan Canal Trail
Lenape Trail
Middlesex Greenway
Union Transportation Trail

References

External links 
Monmouth County Parks page on trail
 Description of southern and middle sections
 Description of "Atlantic", ("eastern", original, or "old") section
 Descriptive Henry Hudson Trail site with many photos
Monmouth County Park System Map
 NJ Transit MOM Project Report

Rail trails in New Jersey
Transportation in Monmouth County, New Jersey
Tourist attractions in Monmouth County, New Jersey
Protected areas of Monmouth County, New Jersey
Bike paths in New Jersey